Michigan's 105th House of Representatives district (also referred to as Michigan's 105th House district) is a legislative district within the Michigan House of Representatives located in parts of Antrim, Kalkaska, and Oscoda counties, as well as all of Crawford, Missaukee, Otsego, and Roscommon counties. The district was created in 1965, when the Michigan House of Representatives district naming scheme changed from a county-based system to a numerical one.

List of representatives

Recent Elections

Historical district boundaries

References 

Michigan House of Representatives districts
Antrim County, Michigan
Charlevoix County, Michigan
Montmorency County, Michigan
Oscoda County, Michigan
Otsego County, Michigan